Organic dust toxic syndrome is a potentially severe flu-like syndrome originally described in farmers, mushroom workers, bird breeders and other persons occupationally exposed to dusty conditions.

Symptoms
Symptoms arise 4 to 12 hours after exposure to an organic dust, and generally last from one to five days. Common generalised symptoms include fever over 38 °C, chills, myalgia and malaise. The most frequent respiratory symptoms are dyspnea and a dry cough, while a wheeze may be present less commonly. Headache, rhinitis, conjunctivitis and keratitis can also be present, and skin irritation may occur in those handling grain.

Respiratory function may worsen to the point where hypoxia occurs, and damage to the airways may lead to non-cardiogenic pulmonary edema one to three days post exposure.

Laboratory investigations may show a raised white cell (and specifically neutrophil) count, while a chest X-ray is often normal or shows minimal interstitial infiltration.

Causes
An inflammatory reaction of the airways and alveoli, the mechanism of organic dust toxic syndrome is thought to be toxic rather than autoimmune in origin. The airways are exposed to high concentrations of organic dust created by some form of disturbance or mechanical process. They can be such materials such as grain kernel fragments, bits of insects, bacteria, fungal spores, molds or chemical residues, the individual particles 0.1 to 50 µm in size. A common scenario is exposure to moldy grain, hay or woodchips, with farmers and pig workers the most common occupations affected. Those who work with grain, poultry and mushrooms also frequently report symptoms.

Diagnosis

Diagnosis is first done through the inspection of the swollen mucosa in the mouth and visible airways. Any inspection of the lung stays nonetheless unapparent.

Treatment
The illness is generally self-limiting. Management on the whole is preventive, by limiting exposure to mouldy environments with ventilation, or by wearing respiratory protection such as facemasks.

History
It was recognised as a distinct clinical syndrome in the 1980s. Previously, cases had been reported and given various names such as pulmonary mycotoxicosis, silo unloader’s syndrome, grain fever, malt fever, toxin fever, humidifier fever, mill fever, toxic alveolitis or allergic alveolitis. In 1994, the National Institute for Occupational Safety and Health published case reports and highlighted the urgency for study of the syndrome.

Research and data collection in the agricultural industry is difficult, as many workers are casual.

References

Respiratory diseases
Syndromes
Dust